Chittagong Court Building is a historic court house in Chittagong, Bangladesh.

History
Construction was started in 1892 and was completed in 1898. It was built on the top of the hill Parir Pahar (Fairy's Hill). The building was built in the Indo-Saracenic Revival architecture style. The building was built to house the Chittagong District Court.

References

Buildings and structures in Chittagong
Courthouses in Bangladesh